Events from the year 1602 in Germany.

Births
 Johannes Rulicius
 Rudolf Christian, Count of East Frisia
 Johann Hülsemann
 Christoph Köler
 Johann Sithmann

Deaths
 Paulus Melissus
 Martin Ruland the Elder
 Thomas Schweicker
 Caspar Peucer

1600s in the Holy Roman Empire